Philip Arthur Dominic Hollom (9 June 1912 – 20 June 2014) was a British ornithologist.

Life
He was born in Bickley, Kent, England, the second of five sons. His younger brother, Sir Jasper Hollom, was Deputy Governor of the Bank of England from 1970 to 1980, having been Chief Cashier of the Bank of England from 1962 to 1966.

In March 1951 he became a member of the editorial board of British Birds magazine under the senior editorship of Max Nicholson, whom he succeeded in 1960. Nicholson, who had remained on the editorial board, and Hollom stood down in 1972 and were replaced on the board by Ian Wallace and Malcolm Ogilvie.

Hollom was a Council member and Vice President of the Ornithological Society of the Middle East. He was the first chairman of the British Birds Rarities Committee and was awarded the British Trust for Ornithology's Tucker Medal in 1954 and the British Ornithologists' Union's Union Medal "for his outstanding contribution to the BOU and to ornithology" in 1984.

He lived in Hydestyle, Surrey, from the mid-1980s until his death. He turned 100 in June 2012 and died on 20 June 2014 at the age of 102. He had been a member of the BOU for 81 years. Hollom was survived by his daughter and two sons.

Bibliography

The Great Crested Grebe Enquiry 1931 by T. H. Harrisson and P. A. D. Hollom. H. F. & G. Witherby (1932)
A field guide to the birds of Britain and Europe by Roger Peterson, Guy Mountfort, P.A.D. Hollom. Collins, 1954
1965 edition: revised and enlarged  in collaboration with I.J. Ferguson-Lees and D.I.M. Wallace
1971 impression:  
2004 edition: 
The Popular Handbook of British birds. H. F. & G. Witherby (1952, revised 1955, 1962, 1968, 1988)
 5th (1988) edition:  
 Trapping Methods for Bird Ringers (BTO Guide No. 1) (1955)
The Popular Handbook of Rarer British birds. H. F. & G. Witherby (1960) - included specially commissioned plates, by David Reid-Henry and Peter Scott
Birds of the Middle East and North Africa. Poyser  (1988)

Dedicated to Hollom
Birds of the Middle East R. F. Porter, S. Christensen, P. Schiermacker-Hansen
1996 
2004

References

Sources
Hollom profile, Copac.ac.uk; accessed 31 July 2017.

1912 births
2014 deaths
English centenarians
Men centenarians
British nature writers
British ornithologists
People from Bickley